Geoffrey Henry Browne, 3rd Baron Oranmore and Browne, 1st Baron Mereworth,  (born Browne-Guthrie; 6 January 1861 – 30 June 1927) was an Irish politician.

Oranmore was the only son of Geoffrey Guthrie-Browne, 2nd Baron Oranmore and Browne, and his Scottish wife, Christina (née Guthrie). He was educated at Trinity College, Cambridge and succeeded his father to the barony in 1900. Following in his father's footsteps, he was elected an Irish Representative Peer, and he took the oath and his seat in the House of Lords on 17 July 1902. In 1906 he dropped the additional surname "Guthrie" which his father had been obliged to adopt in order to succeed to his own father-in-law's estates.

He was a Justice of the Peace and Deputy Lieutenant for County Mayo and was appointed High Sheriff of Mayo for 1890. He was a member of the Irish Convention in 1917–18, a commissioner of the Congested Districts Board for Ireland from 1919, and a member of the Senate of Southern Ireland from 1921.

He was appointed Knight of the Order of St Patrick (KP) in 1918 and was appointed to the Privy Council for Ireland in the 1921 Birthday Honours.

In January 1926 he was raised to the Peerage of the United Kingdom as the 1st Baron Mereworth, of Mereworth Castle (his seat in Kent), although he continued to use his Irish title in preference.

He married Lady Olwen Verena, daughter of Edward Ponsonby, 8th Earl of Bessborough. He was succeeded by his son, Dominick Geoffrey Edward Browne.

Footnotes

References
Obituary, The Times, 1 July 1927

External links
 

1861 births
1927 deaths
Politicians from County Mayo
Politicians from County Galway
Irish representative peers
Barons in the Peerage of Ireland
Barons in the Peerage of the United Kingdom
Knights of St Patrick
Members of the Privy Council of Ireland
Alumni of Trinity College, Cambridge
Members of the Senate of Southern Ireland
High Sheriffs of Mayo
Deputy Lieutenants of Mayo
Barons created by George V